This list of Ports and harbours in Tunisia details the ports, harbours around the coast of Tunisia.

List of ports and harbours in Tunisia

External links

References

Ports

Tunisia